Ormholet is a sound between Barentsøya and Kükenthaløya, at the inner part of Ginevra Bay, Svalbard. It has a length of about one nautical mile, and is about 150 m wide. The tidal currents can be strong and change rapidly.

References

Straits of Svalbard